Oswald Poche (born 28 January 1908 in Brandenburg an der Havel – 22 September 1962 in Dannenberg) was chief of the Gestapo, (secret state police) of Nazi Germany, for Frankfurt at the Lindenstrasse station.

Oswald Poche was a member of the SS (member No. 267316) and a SS and Police Leader. He reached the rank of lieutenant colonel on 30 January 1939.  He was an inspector of the state police at state police control center up to the spring of 1941. His successor was Otto Hellwig.

In March 1941 Poche was appointed head of the State Police Lindenstrasse Station in Frankfurt. He pursued the policy of Final Solution of the Jews in Frankfurt. Poche by using the Gestapo power, between 10 October 1941 and 24 September 1942 organized ten major deportations of about 10,000 Jews to Nazi concentration camps and extermination camps. Poche initiated together with the Chief of Department II, Superintendent Ernst Grosse, the emergency services for all these deportations. By fall 1942 the deportation of all Jews from Frankfurt was essentially complete. Oswald Poche as Gestapo chief of the Police Lindenstrasse Station used Grosse and Heinrich Baab to carry out his orders.

From September 1943, he served as the successor to Reinhard Breder in Einsatzkommando 2, part of Einsatzgruppe A, during the war in the east against the Soviet Union. His task force had committed the 1941–42 mass murder of Jews and political commissars in the wake of Army Group North. In early 1944 a Soviet a bomb attack severely wounded Poche. He returned to Frankfurt to recover with his wife and two sons. On 1 May 1944 he entered a new position as KdS (Chief of SS and Police) in Norwegian Tromsø, where he remained almost until the war ended. In April 1945 Poche was at the Reich Security Main Office (RSHA) office in Berlin. He escaped out of Berlin to Hamburg. Using false papers in the name of the brother of his wife, Koch, he was able to live with his family in Salzwedel, where he worked as a traveling salesman. He died in a hospital in Dannenberg.

References

Further reading
Monica Kingreen (eds.): "After Kristallnacht". Jewish life and anti-Jewish policy in Frankfurt from 1938 to 1945 Campus Verlag, Frankfurt / Main 1999,  .
Seniority List of Schutzstaffel of the NSDAP (Obersturmbannführer and Sturmbannführer), prior of 1 October 1944. SS personnel Main Office, Berlin 1944th
Beate Meyer: Leeway Regional Jewish Representatives (1941-1945). In: Birthe Kundrus, Beate *Meyer (eds.): "The deportation of Jews from Germany: Plans Practice reactions 1938-1945". Wallenstein, Göttingen 2004, pp 68–73.
, Jutta Gemini: Legalized Robbery: the Looting of Jews in Nazi Germany by the Reich Finance Administration in Hesse. Campus Verlag, Frankfurt 2004 , pp 479–482.
: The Judenreferat the Frankfurt Gestapo. In: Monica Kingreen (eds.): "After Kristallnacht". Campus Verlag, Frankfurt / Main 1999, p 245.
Ernst Klee: The Person Encyclopedia to the Third Reich. Fischer paperback publishing house, Frankfurt 2007 , p 466. (entry to Poche, Oswald.)

1908 births
1962 deaths
Gestapo personnel
Holocaust perpetrators in Russia
Holocaust perpetrators in Germany
SS and Police Leaders
Einsatzgruppen personnel